National Lampoon White Album is an American album of humorous songs and spoken word skits. It was originally released as a vinyl record and cassette tape in 1980, but it was reissued and is still available as a CD. It was written and performed by people associated with  National Lampoon magazine and its related productions.

Most of the tracks were by comedians who were not very well known, but the track Hollywood Gay Alliance (which originally aired on the National Lampoon Radio Hour in 1974) featured John Belushi, Chevy Chase, and Christopher Guest.

The musicians who played on the album were Tony Scheuren (vocals, guitar); Michael Simmons, Rhonda Coullet, Rory Dodd (vocals); Don Sarlin, Steve Burgh (guitar); Harvey Shapiro (steel guitar); Curtis Fields (saxophone); Paul Jacobs, Bruce Foster (keyboards); Barry Lazarowitz, Michael Finkelstein, and Yogi Horton (drums).

Track listing
 Perrier Junkie
 At the Bar
 What is God?
 Fartman
 Discoleptic
 Steak
 The Sounds of Physical Love
 Gay Alliance
 Robert Caucasian vs. Squab
 What about Reupholsterers?
 Shakespeare Knock Knocks
 Nude Figure Model
 Couple at the Door
 Christopher Street
 California Hot Tub
 What Turns Women On
 What Were You Expecting - Rock and Roll?

References

National Lampoon albums
1980 albums
1980s comedy albums